Zu Salehabad (also Romanized as Zū Şāleḩābād; also known as Zū, Zū Kalāt, and Şāleḩābād) is a village in Kakhk Rural District, Kakhk District, Gonabad County, Razavi Khorasan Province, Iran. At the 2006 census, its population was 29, in 11 families.

References 

Populated places in Gonabad County